Teen Suicide is an American indie rock band from Baltimore, Maryland.

History
Teen Suicide formed initially as a solo project of Sam Ray in 2009 and released a 2011 compilation, Bad Vibes Forever, which consisted of "early early demos". Soon after this, Eric Livingston joined the band, making a duo with Ray on vocals, guitar, synthesizers, drum machines, and bass, and Livingston on drums and vocals, occasionally accompanied by various unofficial members such as Alec Simke and Caroline White.

In February of the following year, they released an EP titled DC Snuff Film. They followed up that EP with a three-song EP titled Goblin Problems in June 2012. A full-length album entitled Waste Yrself was also being produced around the same time, but it was left uncompleted. Instead, the tracks intended for release on the album were included as part of the compilation Rarities, Unreleased Stuff, and Cool Things, then released separately shortly afterward. In September 2012, Teen Suicide released their debut full-length album titled I Will Be My Own Hell Because There Is a Devil Inside My Body. Around this time, Alec Simke became a full-fledged member of the band. In November 2012, Teen Suicide released another EP titled Hymns prior to announcing they were breaking up.  They played two more shows in December 2012 and January 2013, then disbanded.

In February 2013, the band released a compilation on Bandcamp titled Rarities, Unreleased Stuff, and Cool Things. On the December 27 date of Elvis Depressedly and Crying's tour, the band reformed "on a whim" to play a secret set at the Charm City Art Space in Baltimore. They subsequently reunited to play four reunion shows from February 27 to March 2 with Special Explosion and Sorority Noise, now with a lineup featuring Ray, Simke, John Toohey on guitar, and Brian Sumner on drums.

A new Teen Suicide song titled "Pavement" was featured on Topshelf Records' 2014 digital label sampler. In January 2015, the band signed to Run for Cover Records to release remastered and expanded editions of I Will Be My Own Hell Because There Is a Devil Inside My Body, DC Snuff Film and Waste Yrself, with the two latter records being released as a single album.

Teen Suicide contributed a new song to Paper Trail Records' Thanks for Listening compilation. From December 2015 to January 2016, several demos appeared on the band's social media prior to the announcement of their second album entitled It's the Big Joyous Celebration, Let's Stir the Honeypot, which came out April 1. Although various outlets—including the band's label Run for Cover Records—have referred to the new album as Teen Suicide's final album, the band themselves have announced their new temporary name, "The World's Greatest", "while we figure out what to actually name our new band".

Teen Suicide has since toured twice, once with Say Anything, mewithoutYou, and Museum Mouth, along with a summer tour with Elvis Depressedly and Nicole Dollanganger.

Members
Current
Sam Ray – guitar, lead vocals, synths (2009–2013, 2013–present)
Sean Mercer – drums (2014–present)
Nick Hughes – bass (2017–present)
Kitty Ray – vocals (2018–present)

Former
Eric 'Skiz' Livingston – drums (2009–2013)
Caroline White – viola, backing vocals (2012–2013)
Alec 'Torts' Simke – bass (2012–2013, 2013–2016), guitar (2012)
Brian Sumner – drums (2013–2014)
John 'J2' Toohey – guitar, backing vocals (2013–2016)

Timeline

Discography

Studio albums
I Will Be My Own Hell Because There Is a Devil Inside My Body (2012)
It's the Big Joyous Celebration, Let's Stir the Honeypot (2016)
I Blew on a Dandelion and the Whole World Disappeared (as American Pleasure Club) (2017)
A Whole Fucking Lifetime of This (as American Pleasure Club) (2018)
Tour Tape (as American Pleasure Club) (2018)
Fucking Bliss (as American Pleasure Club) (2019)
Honeybee Table at the Butterfly Feast (2022)

EPs
DC Snuff Film (2012)
Goblin Problems (2012)
Waste Yrself (2012)
Hymns (2012)
Bonus EP (2016)

Compilation albums
Bad Vibes Forever (2011)
Rarities, Unreleased Stuff, and Cool Things (2013)
DC Snuff Film / Waste Yrself (2015)
Rarities, B​-​Sides, Demos, Outtakes, & Secret Songs... 2009-2019 (2019)

References

Musical groups from Maryland
2011 establishments in Maryland
Run for Cover Records artists
Musical groups from Baltimore